Americain is a racehorse.

Americain, Americaine, Americaines, Americains, or variant, may refer to:

 Americaine, the drug Benzocaine
 Américain, the steak tartar style
 Sauce Américaine, the sauce
 Café Americain, an American sitcom starring Valerie Bertinelli
 Hotel Americain, in Amsterdam, Netherlands

See also
 Americanum
 Americanus (disambiguation)
 Americana (disambiguation)
 Americano (disambiguation)
 American (disambiguation)

fr:Américain